Josephine Aloyse Dolan (1913-2004) was a historian and educator who served as the first full-time professor of nursing at the University of Connecticut's School of Nursing. In additional to her teaching responsibilities, Dolan was a historian who collected nursing documents, artifacts, and ephemera, which she donated to the School of Nursing in 1996 to establish the Dolan Collection of Nursing History. After Dolan died, the collection was co-curated by her friend and colleague Eleanor Krohn Herrmann, who died in 2012.

Dolan earned her nursing diploma from St. John's Hospital in Lowell, Massachusetts in 1935. She earned bachelor's and master's degrees in nursing from Boston University in 1942 and 1950. She received honorary doctoral degrees from Rhode Island College in 1974 and from Boston College in 1987. Dolan also served on the board of directors for several professional associations, including the National League for Nursing. She received the League's first Distinguished Service Award in 1972 and was inducted into the American Nurses Association Hall of Fame in 2012. The Connecticut Nurses Association has awarded the Josephine A. Dolan Award for Outstanding Contributions to Nursing Education since 1980. Dolan authored the seminal textbook, Nursing in Society: A Historical Perspective.

References

External links 

 Finding aid for the Josephine A. Dolan Collection of Nursing History - Archives & Special Collections, University of Connecticut Library
 Finding aid for the Josephine A. Dolan Collection of Nursing History - Archives and Manuscripts Department, Boston College Library
 Homepage for the Dolan Collection - the University of Connecticut's School of Nursing
 Nursing in Society: A Historical Perspective - WorldCat record

American nurses
American women nurses
Nursing educators
1913 births
2004 deaths
Nursing theorists
Nursing researchers
Boston University alumni
University of Connecticut faculty
20th-century American historians
20th-century American women writers
American women historians